Admiral Bowen may refer to:

Harold G. Bowen Sr. (1883–1965), U.S. Navy Vice admiral
James Bowen (Royal Navy officer) (1751–1835), British Royal Navy rear admiral
John Bowen (Royal Navy officer) (1780–1827), British Royal Navy rear admiral